Elections to Knowsley Metropolitan Borough Council were held on 4 May 2000.  One third of the council was up for election and the Labour party kept overall control of the council. Overall turnout was 18.0%.  The election in Longview ward was postponed until June.

After the election, the composition of the council was
Labour 61
Liberal Democrat 4

Election result

Ward results

References

2000
2000 English local elections
2000s in Merseyside